Aristotelia callyntrophora is a moth of the family Gelechiidae. It was described by Rebel in 1899. It is found in Yemen.

The wingspan is about 10 mm. The inner margin of the hindwings is densely covered with black scales.

References

Moths described in 1899
Aristotelia (moth)
Moths of Asia